Jack Stewart Newcombe (1910-1931) was a British bobsledder who competed in the early 1930s. He won the bronze medal in the four-man event at the 1931 FIBT World Championships in St. Moritz.

Bobsleigh
Newcombe was the brakeman and a member of the British and Royal Air Force bobsleigh team along with Pilot Officer Dennis Field (steersman), Pilot Officer Ralph Wallace and Pilot Officer Paddy Coote.

After the World Championships Newcombe fell ill and died of Peritonitis on 26 Feb 1931.

Royal Air Force
Newcombe passed through RAF Cranwell on 26 July 1930 from the same class as Douglas Bader.

References

British male bobsledders
1910 births
1931 deaths
Deaths from peritonitis
English expatriates in Switzerland
Royal Air Force personnel
Sportspeople from Kent